Bardhyl Çaushi (1936–1999) was a Kosovo Albanian human rights lawyer and activist. Highly active in cases of human rights abuses in Kosovo, Çaushi was the dean of the school of law of the University of Pristina and the first head of the Independent Jurists of Kosovo. During the NATO bombing of Yugoslavia he was abducted by Yugoslav forces and held in prisons in Serbia. Çaushi's state was unknown until 2005 when his remains were found and identified. His body was returned to Kosovo, where he was reburied with presidential honours.

See also
List of kidnappings
List of solved missing person cases
List of unsolved deaths
Ukshin Hoti

References 

1936 births
1999 deaths
Albanian human rights activists
20th-century Albanian lawyers
Formerly missing people
Kidnapped people
Kosovo Albanians
Prisoners who died in Serbian detention
People from Gjakova
People killed in the Kosovo War
Academic staff of the University of Pristina
Unsolved deaths
Yugoslav Albanians